Sacred Heart High School is an American co-educational private, Roman Catholic high school in Yonkers, New York.  It is in the jurisdiction of the Roman Catholic Archdiocese of New York. It is the only Catholic high school in Yonkers.

It was founded in 1923 and named after the most holy Sacred Heart of Jesus. At the time of its founding, the Sacred Heart community was predominantly composed of Irish-American immigrants, which has had a large influence on the school's image and mascot. Sacred Heart is known as "The Fighting Irish".

Academics

Sacred Heart has a liberal arts curriculum, in accordance with a course of study prescribed by the University of the State of New York, which focuses on English, history, mathematics, the sciences, modern languages, and religion. Students are given the option to take Regents level, Honors or Advanced Placement classes depending on their individual performance.

All students are required to take four years of English, four years of religion, three years of any language, four years of history, three years of mathematics, and three years of science. 

Senior students have the choice of taking elective courses in various academic subjects, and with prior approval, undergraduate courses in conjunction with Westchester Community College through its Advanced College Experience Program.

Notable alumni
 Mike Spano – mayor, Yonkers; former member, New York State Assembly
 Ice Spice – rapper

References

External links 

1923 establishments in New York (state)
Catholic secondary schools in New York (state)
Educational institutions established in 1923
High schools in Yonkers, New York
Private high schools in Westchester County, New York